Derek John West (born December 2, 1996) is an American professional baseball pitcher for the Houston Astros organization.

Career
West attended University High School in Orange City, Florida. As a junior, he tore his hamstring playing for the school's basketball team, and was told that he would not play baseball again; the pain went away after eight weeks and he was able to continue playing. He transferred to Trinity Christian Academy in Deltona, Florida, in 2014. His fastball reached  as a senior. He committed to attend the University of Pittsburgh to play college baseball for the Pittsburgh Panthers.

West missed his freshman year due to recovery from Tommy John surgery and his sophomore year due to surgery to repair his anterior and posterior cruciate ligaments in his right knee. In 2018, he had a 3.24 earned run average (ERA) and 47 strikeouts in 50 innings pitched. The Atlanta Braves selected West in the 28th round of the 2018 MLB draft. He opted not to sign so that he could return to Pittsburgh for his senior year. In 2019, he had a 3.82 ERA and 82 strikeouts in  innings.

The Houston Astros selected West in the 14th round of the 2019 MLB draft, and he signed. West was named to the Netherlands national baseball team for the 2023 World Baseball Classic.

References

External links

Living people
1996 births
People from Orange City, Florida
Baseball players from Florida
Baseball pitchers
Pittsburgh Panthers baseball players
Wareham Gatemen players
Tri-City ValleyCats players
Florida Complex League Astros players
Asheville Tourists players
Corpus Christi Hooks players
Cangrejeros de Santurce (baseball) players
American people of Dutch descent
2023 World Baseball Classic players